The 42nd Canadian Parliament includes a record number of female Members of Parliament, with 88 women elected to the 338-member House of Commons of Canada (26%) in the 2015 election. This represents a gain of twelve seats over the previous record of 76 women in the 41st Canadian Parliament. By contrast, the 114th United States Congress had 105 women sitting in the 435-seat United States House of Representatives.

Of those 88 women, 54 were elected for the first time in the 2015 election.

In his first speech following the election, Prime Minister-designate Justin Trudeau indicated that for the first time in Canadian history, he planned to appoint a fully gender-balanced Cabinet. On November 4, he announced a cabinet which included 15 men and 15 women.

The longest-serving woman in the 42nd Parliament is Hedy Fry, who was first elected in the 1993 election.

On April 3, 2017 four women were elected in by-elections. As of December 2017, there are 92 women currently serving in parliament, representing 27.2 per cent of elected Members of Parliament.

Party standings

Female Members

† denotes women who were newly elected in the 2015 election and are serving their first term in office.
†† denotes women who were not members of the 41st parliament, but previously served in another parliament.
††† denotes women who were newly elected in byelections since the 2015 election.

See also
Women in the 40th Canadian Parliament
Women in the 41st Canadian Parliament

References

42nd Canadian Parliament
Parliament, 42